The Roman Catholic Diocese of Tuticorin is a unit (or 'particular Church') of the Catholic Church in the city of Tuticorin, part of the Ecclesiastical province of Madurai in India.

History

The diocese of Tuticorin comprises the major part of the Tuticorin district, nearly half of the Nellai district and a small portion of the Kanyakumari district. The Catholics of this area trace their origin to the time of St. Francis Xavier who spent most of his missionary life in this area. Separated from the diocese of Tiruchirapalli, Tuticorin was created as a diocese and entrusted to the diocesan clergy in 1923 by the Apostolic Brief "Quae Catholico Nomini" of Pope Pius XI. It was entrusted to the indigenous clergy with Rt. Rev. Francis Tiburtius Roche s.j., as its first Bishop. He was also the first Indian Bishop of the Latin Rite. The patrons of the diocese are St. Francis Xavier and St. Teresa of the Child Jesus.

Vicariates
Five Vicariates are present in the Tuticorin diocese. 
Vicariates and Forane Churches are:
Tuticorin - Sacred Heart Cathedral, Tuticorin, Tuticorin 
Sathankulam - Immaculate Heart of Mary Church, Sathankulam, Sathankulam
Vadakkankulam - Holy Family Church, Vadakkankulam, Vadakkankulam
Manapad - St. Thoma's Church, Veerapandianpattinam, Tiruchendur
Kurukkusalai - Infant Jesus Church, Vemboor

Famous churches
Minor Basilica
Shrine Basilica of Our Lady of the Snows, Tuticorin
Cathedral
Sacred Heart Cathedral, Tuticorin
Special Churches
  Holy Cross Shrine  ,  Manapad 
 St. Antony's shrine, Uvari
 Our lady of Assumption Shrine , Vadakkankulam
  Our lady of redsand Shrine, Sokkankudiyirupu via Sathankulam
  Immaculate Heart of Mary Church, Sathankulam, Sathankulam
  Our Lady of Snows, Kallikulam 
  Our lady of Holy marriage Shrine  , pothakalavilai via Sathankulam
  Sacred Heart Jesus  ,  Alanthalai  via  Tiruchendur
  Holy redeemer church, Thisayanvilai
  Our Lady of Fatima Shrine, Valliyur
  Our lady of Rajakanni Church  ,  Punnakayal
  Our Lady of Nativity ( St. Lucia Shrine )  ,  Anaikarai  via  Thisayanvilai 
  St.James shrine  ,  Srivaikuntam 
  Our lady of Sarrows Shrine  ,  Malayankulam  via  Nanguneri 
  Our lady of Velankanni shrine  ,  Kavalkinaru
  St.Joseph Church, Kootapuli
 Sacred Heart Jesus Church, Kavalkinaru
 St. Joseph Shrine, Panagudi
  St.thomas church  ,  Vembar 
 Holy Spirit Church  ,  Manapad
  Amali annai Church  ,  Tiruchendur
  St.Thomas Church Tiruchendur
  Selva matha Church, Uvari
  St.Anthony's Shrine, Thoothukudi
 Our lady of Lourdes Church, Idinthakarai
  St.Antony's Church, Azhagappapuram
 St Anne's Church, Koodankulam

Notable People
Servant of God, Rev. Fr.Antony Soosainather

Servant of God, Rev. Fr. Augustine Pereira

Leadership
 Bishops of Tuticorin (Latin Rite)
 Bishop Stephen Antony (17 January 2019 – present)
 Bishop Yvon Ambrose (1 April 2005 – 17 January 2019)
 Bishop Peter Fernando (later Archbishop) (8 December 1999 – 22 March 2003)
 Bishop Siluvaimathu Teresanathan Amalnather (29 November 1980 – 8 December 1999)
 Bishop Ambrose Mathalaimuthu (30 August 1971 – 6 December 1979)
 Bishop Thomas Fernando (26 June 1953 – 23 November 1970)
 Bishop Francis Tiburtius Roche S.J. (12 June 1923 – 26 June 1953)

Saints and causes for canonisation
 Servant of God Fr. Antony Soosainather, CR

References

External links
 GCatholic.org
 Catholic Hierarchy
 How the diocese emerged, Diocese of Tuticorin

Roman Catholic dioceses in India
Roman
Roman
Roman Catholic dioceses and prelatures established in the 20th century
Roman